The Supercopa ASOBAL or the Supercopa de España de Balonmano was an annual cup competition for Spanish handball teams. It was organised by the Liga ASOBAL. It was first played for in 1985 and was disputed between the Liga ASOBAL champions and the winners of the Copa del Rey de Balonmano. It was played as a single match, at a neutral venue and in different cities every year. In 2022 it was replaced by Supercopa Ibérica.

Season by season

Titles by team

(1) Includes titles from former and current Atlético Madrid

Related competitions
 Liga ASOBAL
 Copa ASOBAL
 Copa del Rey de Balonmano

References

External links

3
Recurring sporting events established in 1985
Liga ASOBAL
1985 establishments in Spain